Coleophora clypeiferella is a moth of the family Coleophoridae. It is found from Fennoscandia to France, Austria, Hungary and Bulgaria and from Great Britain to Latvia, Lithuania and Ukraine. It is also known from the Caucasus and Ural regions of Russia and China. It occurs in steppe and cultivated areas.

Adults have an unusual sclerotised plate on the tip of the abdomen containing small spines, which is probably used to help break out of the pupal cocoon. They are on wing in July and August.

The larvae feed on Chenopodium album, Chenopodium rubrum and Chenopodium murale. They feed on the seedheads of their host plant and form a case made from fragments of seed during September and October.

References

clypeiferella
Moths described in 1871
Moths of Asia
Moths of Europe